Rally Hill is a historic mansion in Columbia, Tennessee, U.S..  It has been listed on the National Register of Historic Places since August 16, 1984.

History
The house was built c. 1848 for James Walker, President James K. Polk's brother-in-law. Walker was the publisher of The Western Chronicle, a Columbia newspaper, and chancellor of Maury County. Walker lived in the house with his wife, née Jane Maria Polk, and their three sons, including Lucius M. Walker, who served as a general in the Confederate States Army during the American Civil War.

From 1900 to 1912, the house belonged to William M. Biddle, a physician who served as the mayor of Columbia.

Architecture
It is a two-and-a-half-story house and claimed to be designed in a transitional style between Federal and Greek Revival architectural styles by late 20th century sources. However, what remains of the original house bares no indication of Greek Revival influences; the house, with a plain brick facade, large pocket doors, and simple interior trim work, is strictly federal in appearance.

References

National Register of Historic Places in Maury County, Tennessee
Federal architecture in Tennessee
Greek Revival architecture in Tennessee
Houses completed in 1840
Polk family